Niki Leferink (born 12 February 1976) is a Dutch former footballer who played as a striker. He ended his professional career in 2008. Leferink played a total number of 350 games in Dutch professional football.

References
  Profile

1976 births
Living people
People from Haaksbergen
Dutch footballers
Association football forwards
FC Emmen players
Heracles Almelo players
VVV-Venlo players
Go Ahead Eagles players
DETO Twenterand players
Footballers from Overijssel